Permeance, in general, is the degree to which a material admits a flow of matter or energy. Permeance is usually represented by a curly capital P: .

Electromagnetism
In electromagnetism, permeance is the inverse of reluctance. In a magnetic circuit, permeance is a measure of the quantity of magnetic flux for a number of current-turns. A magnetic circuit almost acts as though the flux is conducted, therefore permeance is larger for large cross-sections of a material and smaller for smaller cross section  lengths. This concept is analogous to electrical conductance in the electric circuit.

Magnetic permeance  is defined as the reciprocal of magnetic reluctance  (in analogy with the reciprocity between electric conductance and resistance):
 

which can also be re-written:
 

using Hopkinson's law (magnetic circuit analogue of Ohm's law for electric circuits) and the definition of magnetomotive force (magnetic analogue of electromotive force): 
 

where:
 ΦB, magnetic flux,
 I, current, in amperes,
 N, winding number of, or count of turns in the electric coil.

Alternatively in terms of magnetic permeability (analogous to electric conductivity):
 

where:
 μ, permeability of material,
 A, cross-sectional area,
 , magnetic path length.

The SI unit of magnetic permeance is the henry (H), that is webers per ampere-turn.

Materials science
In materials science, permeance is the degree to which a material transmits another substance.

See also
Dielectric complex reluctance
Reluctance

External articles and references

Electromagnetism
 Properties of Magnetic Materials (units of magnetic permeance)

Material science
 Bombaru, D., Jutras, R., and Patenaude, A., "Air Permeance of Building Materials". Summary report prepared by, AIR-INS Inc. for Canada Mortgage and Housing Corporation, Ottawa, 1988.

Electric and magnetic fields in matter